Max Pinchard (21 July 1928, in Le Havre – 12 December 2009, in Grand-Couronne) was a 20th-century French composer and musicologist.

Biography 
In addition to his activities as composer, Max Pinchard was also :
Teacher at Lycée François Ier du Havre as well as at the Rouen conservatory ;
Director of the music conservatories at Saint-Étienne-du-Rouvray, Grand-Couronne and Petit-Couronne ; 
Music critic for the magazines Diapason, Revue du son, for more than twenty years ;
Author of several books ;
Conductor.

 

He was a member of the Académie des sciences, belles-lettres et arts de Rouen.

Max Pinchard was philosopher Pinchard's father.

Works

Symphonic orchestra 
Arche forte, Symphonic Movement No. 3
Cheminement, Sinfonietta
La Forêt, le Fleuve, la Ville, Triptyque Symphonique
La Mort du Clown for orchestra
Mystérieux et Intense, A Variation on a Theme by Debussy for orchestra (1979)
Quadruple mouvement symphonique n°1
Suite noble
Suite Symphonique d'après l'oratorio Sainte unité de Trois.

Chamber orchestra 
Aux fêtes de la pluie for cello and chamber orchestra 
Chorals polyphoniques I et II
De nuage et de vent Sinfonia for string orchestra
Double Concerto for viola, cello and string orchestra (1969)
Joyeusement Vôtre 5 instantanés for string orchestra
L'Autre Versant du Jour, Symphonic Movement  No. 2
Symphonie du Verseau, Symphony for string orchestra
Terre d'ombre, Choral for string orchestra

Chamber music 
Grand ciel voilé, 2 Pieces for viola and piano (1980)
L'eau des ombres, 2 Pieces for violin and viola (1976)
Prélude et petite danse for viola and cello (1966)

Publications 
1957: 
1959: Connaissance de Georges Migot, Musicien Français, Éditions Ouvrières 
1963: Ma Discothèque Classique, Édition Marabout
1964: Ma Discothèque de Variétés, Édition Marabout 
1967: A la Recherche de la Musique Vivante, Les Éditions de l'Atelier 
Influence du Chant Grégorien sur la Musique, Éditions Labergerie-Mame
1969: Encyclopédie des Musiques Sacrées, Tome II 
1971: Encyclopédie des Musiques Sacrées, Tome III 
Les Musiciens de l'Espérance, André Caplet, Lili Boulanger, Jean Cartan, Éditions Labergerie-Mame

Honours 
 Chevalier dans l'Ordre des Palmes Académiques (1968)
 Chevalier dans l'Ordre des Arts et des Lettres (1990)

External links 
 Site du compositeur
 Biographie complète de Max Pinchard
 Max Pinchard avait la musique au cœur in Paris Normandie.fr (15/12/2009)
 Max Pinchard on Conservatoire musique dance
 Max Pinchard, l’hommage havrais in Normandie actu
 Création d'un concerto du compositeur né au Havre Max PINCHARD on INA.fr (16/5/1968)

1928 births
Musicians from Le Havre
2009 deaths
20th-century French composers
20th-century French musicologists
French male conductors (music)
Chevaliers of the Ordre des Arts et des Lettres
Chevaliers of the Ordre des Palmes Académiques
20th-century French conductors (music)
20th-century French male musicians